Florin Constantiniu (8 April 1933 – 13 April 2012) was a Romanian historian.

A native of Bucharest, he attended Saint Sava National College, followed by the University of Bucharest. He was elected a corresponding member of the Romanian Academy in 1999, and was raised to titular status in 2006.

Publications

References

1933 births
2012 deaths
Writers from Bucharest
Saint Sava National College alumni
University of Bucharest alumni
20th-century Romanian historians
21st-century Romanian historians
Titular members of the Romanian Academy